Vlado Lisjak (born 29 April 1962 in Petrinja) is a former Croatian Greco-Roman wrestler who competed in the 1984 Summer Olympics for Yugoslavia. He won gold in the 68 kg category, beating Tapio Sipilä in the final. Because of his feat he won the Croatian Sportsman of the Year award in 1984.

Lisjak retired from competitive wrestling in 1993, and has since worked as coach and director of the Croatian national wrestling team.

References

External links
Vlado Lisjak at Sports-Reference.com

1962 births
Living people
People from Petrinja
Croatian male sport wrestlers
Olympic wrestlers of Yugoslavia
Wrestlers at the 1984 Summer Olympics
Yugoslav male sport wrestlers
Olympic gold medalists for Yugoslavia
Olympic medalists in wrestling
Medalists at the 1984 Summer Olympics
Wrestling coaches